South Leitrim was a parliamentary constituency in Ireland. From 1885 to 1918 it returned one Member of Parliament (MP) to the House of Commons of the United Kingdom of Great Britain and Ireland.

Prior to the 1885 general election and after the dissolution of Parliament in 1918 the area was part of the Leitrim constituency.

Boundaries
This constituency comprised the southern part of County Leitrim.

1885–1918: The baronies of Carrigallen and Mohill, and that part of the barony of Leitrim not contained within the constituency of North Leitrim.

Members of Parliament

Elections

Elections in the 1880s

Elections in the 1890s

Elections in the 1900s

Elections in the 1910s

References

Westminster constituencies in County Leitrim (historic)
Constituencies of the Parliament of the United Kingdom established in 1885
Constituencies of the Parliament of the United Kingdom disestablished in 1918